Austin Bennett Tice (born August 11, 1981) is an American freelance journalist and a veteran U.S. Marine Corps officer who was kidnapped while reporting in Syria on August 14, 2012.

Early life and education

Tice is from Houston, Texas, the eldest of seven siblings. He is an Eagle Scout and grew up dreaming of becoming an international correspondent for NPR. At the age of 16, Tice attended the University of Houston for one year, then transferred to and graduated from the Edmund A. Walsh School of Foreign Service at Georgetown University in 2002. He completed two years of study at Georgetown University Law Center before going to Syria as a freelance journalist during the summer break before his third and final year of law studies.

Career
Tice was previously a U.S. Marine Corps infantry officer, serving tours of duty in Iraq and Afghanistan. He left active duty as a Captain but remained in the Marine Corps Reserves. Tice's father said, "He was hearing reports from Syria saying this is happening and that is happening but it can't be confirmed because there really are no reporters on the ground. And he said, 'You know, this is a story that the world needs to know about.'" He was one of only a few foreign journalists to report from inside Syria during the intensification of the civil war. He entered the country in May 2012 and traveled through central Syria, filing battlefield dispatches before arriving in Damascus in late July 2012. Tice's reporting garnered his Twitter account 2,000 followers. He stopped tweeting after August 11, 2012.

Tice was one of the first American correspondents to witness Syrian-rebel confrontations. His coverage was cited, along with efforts of additional reporters, as contributing to McClatchy winning a George Polk Award for war reporting for its coverage of Syria's civil war.

Abduction 

Tice was working as a freelance journalist for McClatchy, The Washington Post, CBS and other media when he was abducted from Darayya, Syria. There was no immediate contact from Tice or his captors, but in September 2012 a 47-second video of Tice blindfolded and bound was released. In October 2012, a US spokesperson said it was believed, based on the limited information it had, that Tice was in the custody of the Syrian government. No government or group in Syria has said it is holding Tice.

In February 2015, Reporters Without Borders (RSF) launched its pro bono #freeaustintice campaign. Since September 2012, RSF has been assisting and advising his family. His parents asked RSF to help them raise awareness about their son's situation. RSF partnered with the global advertising agency J. Walter Thompson to prepare a public awareness campaign in order to do everything possible to bring Tice safely home. The campaign has since garnered over 17,000 signatories and a widespread blindfold pledge on social media.

In April 2018, the FBI increased their reward for information regarding Tice's whereabouts to $1 million and two US officials said Tice is believed to have survived captivity.

In August 2018, a US State Department official said the US government still believes Tice is being held by the Syrian government or its allies. Concerning an August meeting between US and Syrian security officials in Damascus, two senior US intelligence sources told Reuters the "ongoing dialogue" with the Syrian government included the fate of Tice.

In November 2018, Reuters reported that Robert C. O'Brien, the US Special Presidential Envoy for Hostage Affairs, had called on Russia to "exert whatever influence they have in Syria" to secure Tice's release. The Syrian government said that it was unaware of Tice's whereabouts.

In December 2018, Tice's parents announced during a press conference that they had received new information that indicated their son was still alive without elaborating further. Speaking to reporters from Beirut, Tice's parents said they believed that the best chance of Tice's release would come from direct talks between the US and Syrian governments.

After Tice's disappearance was mentioned by WHCA president Steven Portnoy at the 2022 White House Correspondents Dinner, President Joe Biden invited Tice's parents to the White House for a meeting. Following the 45 minute meeting, his parents said they are hopeful for his return. As part of a statement issued to mark the tenth anniversary of Tice's captivity, Biden noted that the US government knew "with certainty" that the journalist was being held by the Syrian government.

See also

 2014 ISIL beheading incidents
 Foreign hostages in Iraq
 List of kidnappings
 Kenneth Bigley
 Nick Berg
 Peter Theo Curtis
 James Foley (journalist)
 Daniel Pearl
 Matt Schrier
 Steven Sotloff

References

Further reading

External links
 The Family of Austin Tice site
 Free Austin Tice on Facebook
 Austin Tice on Flickr
 Austin Tice on Twitter
 Free Austin Tice on Twitter

1981 births
2010s missing person cases
American people taken hostage
Disappeared journalists
Foreign hostages in Syria
Georgetown University Law Center alumni
Journalists from Houston
Kidnapped American people
Missing person cases in Syria
Walsh School of Foreign Service alumni
The Washington Post people
United States Marine Corps officers
War correspondents of the Syrian civil war